Nam Phrik Num is a kind of “Nam phrik”. It is commonly served in a small bowl or saucer placed by the main dish as a condiment or a dip, mostly for uncooked or boiled vegetables, sticky rice, or pork crackling.

Ingredients 
 5 fresh green or yellow chilies, or long green aubergines
 113 grams or 1/4 pound of shallots, and halved if large
 7 cloves of garlic
 45 grams or 3 tablespoons of coriander leaves, washed well, dried and coarsely torn
 30 ml or 2 tablespoons of Asian fish sauce (preferably nam pla)
 30 ml or 2 tablespoons of fresh lime or lemon juice

Nam phrik num is made from fresh green or yellow chilis, long green aubergines, shallots, garlic, coriander leaves, and may contain Asian fish sauce, and fresh lime or lemon juice, all of which is pounded in a mortar. It is regularly served with rice and fresh seasonal vegetables.

Cooking method 
Roast the chilies, aubergine, garlic, and whole shallots until the vegetables are soft or the skins just start to turn black. Cut off the skin of the chilies and discard the seeds to make it less spicy if desired. Finely chop chilies, shallots, and garlic and transfer to a bowl. To add more taste, add coriander leaves, fish sauce, and lemon juice and stir until all ingredients are mixed well.  The taste balance of Nam phrik num should be hot and sharp. If it is too hot add a little more sugar, lime juice or fish sauce. To blend and mellow flavors, leave covered for 30 minutes.  Serve with rice, spring onions, kap moo (pork crackling) and fresh or boiled vegetables.

Nutritional content 
Nam Phrik Num gives low level of fat and energy, but high level of fiber. The number of phenolic compounds in Nam phrik num is 499 mg GAE/100 g and it can neutralize free radicals (DPPH antioxidant activity; IC50) 0.29 grams per liter.

References

Chili pepper dishes
Dips (food)
Northern Thai cuisine